Sir Lionel Walden (1620 - 23 March 1698) of Huntingdon was an English Member of Parliament in 1661-1679 and 1685-1687 and Mayor of Huntingdon for 1686–87.

Early life
He was born in 1620 and baptised on 19 December 1620.   He was the only son of another Lionel Walden and Elizabeth Bawde, daughter of Morrice Bawde of Somersby, Lincolnshire.

Career
He was Member of Parliament for Huntingdon in the Cavalier Parliament from 1661-1679 and for Huntingdonshire in 1685. He was knighted on 29 January 1673 and elected Mayor of Huntingdon for the year 1686–87.

Family
Lionel married Elizabeth Balaam, daughter and coheir of Charles Balaam of Elm, Cambridgeshire.  They had a son and two daughters. His son Lionel Walden (c.1653-1701) also became Member of Parliament for Huntingdon.

References

1620 births
1698 deaths
Members of the Parliament of England (pre-1707) for constituencies in Huntingdonshire
Knights Bachelor
Mayors of places in Cambridgeshire
English MPs 1661–1679
English MPs 1685–1687